Magura is a village in Amrazuri Union of Kawkhali Upazila, Pirojpur District in the Barisal Division of southwestern Bangladesh.

References

Populated places in Pirojpur District